An acral nevus  is a cutaneous condition of the palms, soles, fingers, or toes (peripheral body parts), characterized by a skin lesion that is usually macular or only slightly elevated, and may display a uniform brown or dark brown color, often with linear striations.

Acral nevi may occur in all ethnic groups, but are more common in dark-skinned people. The acral nevus is a benign skin lesion that can occur at any age, but is generally noticed between 10 and 30 years of age. Both children and adults may be observed with this skin lesion. The prevalence of acral nevi increases directly with degree of skin pigmentation. In a study, palmar or plantar nevi were detected in 42.0% of black (50 of 119) vs 23.0% of whites (79 of 343). Palmar or plantar nevi of 6 mm diameter or larger were detected in 3.4% of blacks (4 of 119) vs 0.6% of whites.

They are brown to dark brown in color and have linear streaks of darker pigmentation. Size is usually 7 mm or less, oval or spindle shaped, and well-demarcated. They become stable after an initial growth phase, and the number of lesions also decreases; a new lesion in middle-aged or elderly people should raise suspicion of acral lentiginous melanoma.

Additional image

See also
 Acral lentiginous melanoma
 List of cutaneous conditions

References

External links 

Melanocytic nevi and neoplasms